Manuel Antonin Ildefonse Cypriano Luque de Soria (1853/54, Almería - 8 November 1924, Autun) was a Spanish-born caricaturist, lithographer, designer and painter, who spent most of his career in Paris.

Biography 
He was born to a family of modest means. His future style was heavily influenced by the journal's Director, José Luis Pellicer, who was a patron to numerous young artists. While there, he made contributions to other similar publications.

In 1875, he was in Paris; living in the Latin Quarter. He contacted Pierre Véron, the Editor-in-Chief of Le Charivari and Journal Amusant, who helped establish his reputation as a caricaturist in France. Although he returned to Madrid in 1876, he continued to send drawings to Véron.

He returned to Paris in 1881, and would remain in France for the rest of his life. Between 1885 and 1890, he was the primary contributor of cover illustrations for the series,  edited by André Gill and Félicien Champsaur. He created 68 altogether, the best known of which depicts Arthur Rimbaud (1888). On the basis of that, he was commissioned to provide a series of engraved portraits for Les Poètes maudits, by Paul Verlaine. He then illustrated Les Courses de taureaux, by Armand Dayot.

In 1892, he began a second career as a painter; exhibiting his works in Madrid for many years. At the same time, he once again provided caricatures for a Spanish publication, Blanco y Negro.

He married the widow, Yvonne de Courneau de Bosquet, from La Garenne-Colombes, in 1908. Shortly after, they moved to Autun, where he died in 1924. Some of his original works may be seen there, at the Musée Rolin.

Selected covers from Les Hommes d'aujourd'hui

Sources 
 Detailed biography of Luque @ the Lázaro Galdiano Museum.
 Manuel Ossorio y Bernard, "Luque (D. Manuel)", In: Galería biográfica de artistas españoles del siglo XIX, 1884, Imprenta de Moreno y Rojas, reprinted by Nabu Press, 2012,

External links 

1850s births
1924 deaths
Year of birth uncertain
Spanish caricaturists

French caricaturists

Spanish emigrants to France
French illustrators
People from Almería